Ola Cabs (stylized as OLΛ) is an Indian multinational ridesharing company, headquartered in Bangalore. It also operates in other business verticals including financial services and cloud kitchens.

A variety of venture capitalists including Softbank have large stakes in the company. In January 2018, Ola extended into its first overseas market, Australia, and launched in New Zealand in September 2018. In March 2019, Ola began its operations in the UK.

History
June 2015 onwards, Ola users gained access to TFS cabs via the Ola mobile application. Later in the year in November, Ola further acquired Geotagg, a trip-planning applications company, for an undisclosed sum.

In a move to expand beyond cab aggregation, Ola acquired struggling foodtech company Foodpanda India with an eye on leveraging the growing food delivery segment business in December 2017. In April 2018, Ola made its second acquisition with Ridlr (formerly Traffline), a public transport ticketing app. Later in August 2018, Ola financed Series A funding of the scooter rent startup Vogo, and again in December, invested another $100 million.

In March 2019, the Karnataka state transport department suspended Ola's operating license for six months for violation of license conditions and violation of Karnataka On-Demand Transportation Technology Aggregator Rules, 2016. This was on account of Ola running bike taxi services though it only had license for four wheeler taxi operations. The company termed the order unfortunate and was looking at working with driving partners to continue functioning. They also claimed to be in touch with authorities to sort things out.

In 2019, more than 10,000 drivers applied both in online and offline mode, ahead of its launch in London. In February 2020, Ola launched its taxi-hailing services in London with over 25,000 drivers registered.

Subsidiaries and services
Apart from the ride-hailing business Ola Cabs, the holding company ANI Technologies operates Ola Fleet, Ola Financial Services, and Ola Foods. As of September 2019, it also owns a 6% stake in the electric scooter manufacturing company Ola Electric.

Ride hailing
Ola Cabs offers different levels of service, ranging from economic to luxury travel. The cabs are reserved through a mobile app and also through their website and the service accepts both cash and online payments. It claims to clock an average of more than 150,000 bookings per day and commands 60% of the market share in India as of 2014. As of 2019, the company has expanded to a network of more than 1.5 million drivers across 250 cities.

In November 2014, Ola diversified to incorporate auto rickshaws on a trial basis in Bengaluru. After the trial phase, Ola Auto expanded to other cities like Delhi, Pune, Chennai starting in December 2014 and also in Hyderabad Metro.

In March 2016, it introduced bike taxi service on its platform. Ola has faced legal troubles in many states where operating bike taxis is illegal.

Ola Fleet
In January 2015, Ola acquired radio taxi company GCabs for an undisclosed amount and renamed it as Ola Fleet Technologies. Ola Fleet is engaged in leasing of cabs to partnered drivers.

Ola Foods
Ola entered food delivery segment in March 2015 under the name Ola Cafe, but stopped the services in March 2016. It began offering food delivery services again in December 2017 with the acquisition of Foodpanda's Indian subsidiary for an undisclosed sum. Ola also announced that it would infuse up to $200 million in the food delivery unit. While the number of users and orders went up in 2018 due to discounts and offers, the numbers dropped sharply in early 2019. In June 2019, it stopped food delivery service and laid off most of its 1,500 delivery executives. However, it continued to operate Foodpanda's cloud kitchen business. As of 2021, Ola Foods operates more than 50 cloud kitchens, including its flagship brand called Khichdi Experiment, in six cities.

Ola Financial Services
In November 2015, Ola launched its mobile payments and wallet product called OlaMoney. OlaMoney is owned by Ola Financial Services, which also offers other financial products such as buy now pay later, insurance, co-branded credit cards and vehicle loans in partnership with other financial institutions.

Defunct services

Ola Dash
In July 2015, Ola launched Ola Store, a grocery delivery service in Bangalore, before shutting it down in March 2016. In November 2021, Ola Store returned with quick delivery of grocery and essentials, starting with a pilot launch in Bangalore. By January 2022, Ola set up 200 dark stores across 9 cities, and rebranded the service as Ola Dash. In April 2022, Ola Dash scaled down its operations from 9 cities to 3 cities and dismissed over 2,100 contract workers. In June 2022, it shut down Ola Dash in all cities.

Ola Cars
In October 2021, Ola launched its new and pre-owned car marketplace called Ola Cars in 30 cities, which was also expected to sell new vehicles of Ola Electric and other brands. By May 2022, the company had scaled down operations to 17 cities. In June 2022, it closed Ola Cars across all cities and stated that Ola Cars' "infrastructure, technology and capabilities will now be repurposed towards growing Ola Electric’s sales and service network."

Criticism

Technology
Ola Cabs' technology came under criticism regarding the security of its mobile app. The API calls could be replayed to top up its wallet.

In August 2016, a privacy breach occurred when customers' details such as names, phone numbers and addresses, in Bangalore, were received as SMS messages by an individual in Chennai. Although these unanticipated messages were reported to Ola, the company ignored them, even under the threat of being reported to the TRAI. The issue was reportedly fixed three weeks later after receiving considerable media coverage and social media attention.

On January 19, 2020, a technical glitch caused multiple users to receive notifications such as "Your ride is on the way" or "Your ride is here" despite them not even attempting to book through the platform. In some cases, cancelling the ride even attempted to automatically book another ride.

Overcharging and lack of transparency in charging
The refund policy of Ola Cabs has been criticised because of charging errors caused by technical glitches in their system. Surge pricing has been an issue with customers, as Ola is said to initially eliminate competition by lowering prices, and then hiking up prices through what it calls surge pricing. The fact that the same ride can cost different amounts depending on the time, day and the profiles, history and rating of the driver as well as passenger has also incurred much customer wrath.

Driver concerns
Ola from January 2017 has been highly criticised for continuously dropping the driver incentives which in turn is affecting driver-partner's monthly income. Most nowadays fail to cope with their monthly EMIs and other dues. Daily income of cab drivers is now equal to auto drivers running in the city after deducting all dues.

Charges comprise:
 Base fare (fixed amount)
 Distance fare (charged per kilometre)
 Ride time fare (charged per time taken to travel)
 Peak pricing (direct ratio depending on demand for cabs)
GST (5%)
 Toll charges (toll collection if crossing a toll junction)

Ola and Uber have also been criticised due to their practice of baiting drivers and passengers, initially with discounts and bonuses, and then hiking up fares without passing the proceeds to drivers. Their practice of taking large signing up amounts from drivers and not considering them employees has also been criticised. Both companies contractually treat drivers as "contractors" thus excusing themselves from any legal obligations. In an interview, Pranay Jivrajka, a co-founder of OLA, claimed that the company will be creating 5 million new "opportunities" in the next five years. He was, however, careful not to use the word jobs for these opportunities. He added that it was not just about jobs but creating an ecosystem.

Assaults on and Murders of Ola cab drivers 
There have been 11 cases of murders, and over 90 cases of kidnapping and robbery of drivers working for app-based cab aggregators including Ola, by criminals posing as passengers using fake profiles. The most recent case happened in the city of Pune in June 2019 when a passenger killed the driver to steal his car. Two other murders of Ola drivers by robbers took place in New Delhi and Agra respectively.

Congestion externalities

A recent study has shown that Ola may be contributing significantly to congestion in three major Indian cities - Mumbai, Bangalore and New Delhi. The adverse congestion effects were found to be the highest in the busiest areas of each city during peak hours. The study also reported that many who use these services would have otherwise used more efficient forms of public transport, such as the Delhi Metro.

Driver credibility

Delhi Transport authority in early 2015 questioned the credibility and required verification of drivers working for Ola, along with other competitors such as Uber. The inquiry revealed that approximately 80% of drivers amongst all services did not possess permits to ply commercial transport services in Delhi. Drivers also protested outside the Kukatapally, Hyderabad office of Ola, demanding more transparency over payments.

References

External links
 
 Ola Electric

 
Ridesharing companies of India
Online companies of India
Transport companies established in 2010
Taxis of India
Companies based in Bangalore
Softbank portfolio companies
Indian companies established in 2010
2010 establishments in Karnataka
Multinational companies headquartered in India
Transport Network Companies